Tongyangxi, also known as Shim-pua marriage in Min Nan dialects (and in phonetic Hokkien transcription using Chinese characters: 新婦仔), was a tradition of arranged marriage dating back to pre-modern China, in which a family would adopt a pre-adolescent daughter as a future bride for one of their pre-adolescent (usually infant) sons, and the children would be raised together.

A direct translation of the Taiwanese (Hokkien) word "sim-pu-a" is "little daughter-in-law", in which the characters "sim-pu" mean daughter-in-law and the particle character "a" ( or ) indicates a diminutive.  The similarly used Mandarin Chinese term "tongyangxi" means literally "child (童) raised (養) daughter-in-law (媳)" and is the term typically used as translation for the English term "child bride".

These child marriages were more common among the poor, where they served to guarantee a wife for a poor son. The families that gave their daughters up also benefited to the extent that they no longer had to provide for a daughter, someone who was bound to marry and leave the family one day. Such marriages were often unsuccessful, and they were outlawed in China in 1949. In Taiwan, compulsory education got these girls out of their homes and exposed them to the broader world, often leading to them leaving their adopted families. The practice ended there by the 1970s.

Social anthropology perspective
Within social anthropology research of Chinese marriage, shim-pua marriage is referred to as a "minor marriage" because the daughter-in-law joins her future husband's household when both are minors, in contrast to Chinese major marriage, in which the bride joins her husband's household on the day of the wedding. The shim-pua daughter was often adopted into a family who already had a son to whom she would be betrothed, though this was not always the case. Instead, some families adopted a shim-pua daughter prior to having a son, prompted by a traditional belief that adopting a shim-pua would enhance a wife's likelihood of bearing a son. Although the shim-pua daughter joins the household as a child, the marriage would only occur after both had reached puberty. Depending upon the family's socioeconomic status and financial means, the wedding could range from a large banquet on par with a major marriage to a small family ceremony, or in the simplest cases "a bow to the ancestors and a slight change in the family's sleeping arrangements."

Shim-pua marriage occurred over a range of socioeconomic classes, but was particularly common among poor and rural families. Among the well to do, marrying a son in a major marriage was prestigious and a display of status, but also costly. In poorer and more rural communities, shim-pua minor marriage was inexpensive and helped to ensure that no matter how poor a family was, their sons would have wives when they reached marrying age, and thus a greater likelihood of producing descendants. In contrast, the high bride price to acquire a bride for a son to wed in a major marriage could be prohibitive, sometimes as much as a year's income for the family. If the family could not afford such a bride for major marriage, this could result in a failure to produce descendants and the end of the family lineage. In contrast, the costs of adopting an infant daughter were low and the costs of raising her as a shim-pua often included only food and clothing. In poor communities, limited wealth or status motivated both the adoption of a shim-pua daughter into the family and the giving up of biological daughters as shim-pua to other families. For a family of limited means or social status, a biological daughter offered little surety; traditionally she would be married off into another family and would neither care for her parents in old age nor extend the family lineage. In contrast, a shim-pua daughter would remain in the household, caring for the parents through their old age, and would bear their descendants. For these reasons, adoption of an infant shim-pua daughter frequently coincided with giving up a biological infant daughter for adoption and then raising the shim-pua daughter in her place.

These marriages were often unsuccessful. This has been explained as a demonstration of the Westermarck effect.

End of the practice
In mainland China, the practice was outlawed by the Communist Party of China in 1949.

In Taiwan, several legal issues arose in the 1950s, when shim-pua daughters were registered as adopted daughters, or their male equivalent were registered as adopted sons. Because the couple were legally considered step-siblings, the Taiwanese common law forbade their marriage. Three judicial reviews were made by the Judicial Yuan to allow their marriage. Shim-pua marriage fell out of practice by the 1970s due to increased wealth resulting from Taiwan's economic success, making such arrangements unnecessary. One factor that accelerated the demise of shim-pua marriage was the establishment of compulsory public education in Taiwan, which compelled families to send all children, including daughters and adoptive shim-pua daughters to school. Greater exposure outside the home and education itself often created opportunities for shim-pua daughters to resist or escape the marriage arrangement.

Related concepts
Zhaozhui ( or ) is a related custom by which a wealthy family that lacks an heir might take in a boy child, although such marriages usually involve a procreation-age male. Since these marriages required the husband entering the wife's household (contrary to traditional Chinese norms), they were relegated to a lower social status. During the Qing dynasty, these marriages became increasingly common to maintain inheritance bloodlines. The boy would take on the familial name of his new family, and typically would marry the family's daughter.

See also
Child marriage
Forced marriage
Japanese adult adoption
Mukoyōshi

References

Bibliography

Taiwanese culture
Marriage in Chinese culture
Types of marriage
Marriage, unions and partnerships in China
Incest